Owen Burns (28 June 1911 – 16 June 1964) was a South African cricketer. He played in one first-class match for Border in 1936/37.

See also
 List of Border representative cricketers

References

External links
 

1911 births
1964 deaths
South African cricketers
Border cricketers
Cricketers from East London, Eastern Cape